The 1993–94 Divizia A was the seventy-sixth season of Divizia A, the top-level football league of Romania.

Teams

League table

Positions by round

Results

Top goalscorers

Champion squad

References

Liga I seasons
Romania
1993–94 in Romanian football